The Multan Sultans is a franchise cricket team that represents Multan in the Pakistan Super League. The team made its PSL debut in  2018 season.  Multan Sultans beat Peshawar Zalmi in the final by 47 runs to win their first PSL title.

Background
Multan Sultans are the sixth team to join the league. 2018 was their inaugural season.  After the league was started in 2016, this was the first expansion of the league. Tom Moody serves as their coach. Prior to the start of the fourth season, Schon Properties failed to pay the $5.2 million annual fee, and Pakistan Cricket Board had cancelled their franchise. After the cancellation, the PCB took responsibility of all player and coach contracts while the public tender process took place to grant the repackaged rights of the team. The PCB asked interested bidders to collect the bidding documents from its offices by 14 December 2018. The financial proposal of the technically qualified bidders is due to be opened on 18 December 2018.  On 20 December 2018, PSL announced that Ali Tareen-led Multan consortium had won the franchise rights for the sixth team for a seven-year period, by exceeding the PCB's reserve price set at $5.21 million per year. Tareen's bid was for $6.35 million per year, making this the most expensive franchise.

Points table

Statistics

Most runs

Source: ESPNcricinfo

Most wickets

 Source: ESPNcricinfo

See also
 2021 Pakistan Super League squads

References

2021 in Punjab, Pakistan
2021 Pakistan Super League 
Sultans in 2021
2021